Dirtbag Nunatak is a ridge-like nunatak rising to ,  south-southwest of Mount Manke, in the Harold Byrd Mountains in Antarctica. The feature was mapped by the United States Geological Survey from ground surveys and U.S. Navy aerial photographs, 1960–63. It was visited in 1977–78 by a United States Antarctic Research Program – Arizona State University geological party, led by Edmund Stump, and named in the spirit of Coalsack Bluff, as thin lenses of disintegrating mica and schist form a type of light soil on the slopes of the nunatak.

References 

Nunataks of Marie Byrd Land